Tomás Ezequiel Gramisci (born 28 March 1998) is an Argentine professional footballer who plays as a defender for Comunicaciones.

Career
Gramisci played for the academies of San Lorenzo and Fénix, joining the latter in 2017. In 2018, Gramisci joined Comunicaciones of Primera B Metropolitana. He made his opening appearances in professional football in December 2018, as he featured for the full duration of home fixtures with Sacachispas and Tristán Suárez.

Career statistics
.

References

External links

1998 births
Living people
Place of birth missing (living people)
Argentine footballers
Association football defenders
Primera B Metropolitana players
Club Comunicaciones footballers